Aşağı Ləgər (also, Ashaga-Leger, Ashagy-Leger, Ashagy-Lyagyar, and Ash-Leger) is a village and municipality in the Qusar Rayon of Azerbaijan.  It has a population of 1,725.

References 

Populated places in Qusar District